Brachytheciastrum is a genus of mosses belonging to the family Brachytheciaceae.

The genus was first described by Ignatov and Huttunen.

The genus has almost cosmopolitan distribution.

References

Hypnales
Moss genera